Hugo Omar Martínez (born 22 October 1942) is an Argentine boxer. He competed in the men's featherweight event at the 1964 Summer Olympics. At the 1964 Summer Olympics, he lost to Khiru Soeun of Cambodia.

References

External links
 

1942 births
Living people
Argentine male boxers
Olympic boxers of Argentina
Boxers at the 1964 Summer Olympics
Place of birth missing (living people)
Featherweight boxers